In the run up to the Turkish general election scheduled to take place in 2023, various organizations carry out opinion polling to gauge voting intention in Turkey. Results of such polls are displayed in this article. These polls only include Turkish voters nationwide and do not take into account Turkish expatriates voting abroad. The date range for these opinion polls are from the previous general election, held on 24 June 2018, to the present day.

Recep Tayyip Erdoğan
Recep Tayyip Erdoğan is the current president of Turkey and the leader of Justice and Development Party (AKP).

Graphical summary

2022

2021

2020

2019

2018

Ekrem İmamoğlu
Ekrem İmamoğlu is the current mayor of İstanbul and a potential presidential candidate of Republican People's Party (CHP).

Graphical summary

Mansur Yavaş
Mansur Yavaş is the current mayor of Ankara and a potential presidential candidate of Republican People's Party (CHP).

Graphical summary

Kemal Kılıçdaroğlu
Kemal Kılıçdaroğlu is the president of, and a potential presidential candidate of Republican People's Party (CHP).

Meral Akşener
Meral Akşener is the president of, and a presidential candidate of Good Party (İYİ). She was previously member of MHP, and a former Minister of the Interior.

Devlet Bahçeli
Devlet Bahçeli is the president of Nationalist Movement Party (MHP).

Selahattin Demirtaş
Selahattin Demirtaş is the former co-chairperson and presidential candidate of Peoples' Democratic Party (HDP). He is currently incarcerated.

Ali Babacan
Ali Babacan is the leader of Democracy and Progress Party (DEVA). He was previously a member of AKP. He was a former Minister of Foreign Affairs, and of Customs and Trade.

Ahmet Davutoğlu
Ahmet Davutoğlu is the leader of Future Party (GP). He was previously a member of AKP. He was formerly the Prime Minister of Turkey.

Muharrem İnce
Muharrem İnce is the chairperson of Homeland Party. He was a member of Republican People's Party (CHP), and he was CHP's previous presidential candidate.

Temel Karamollaoğlu
Temel Karamollaoğlu is the leader and presidential candidate of Felicity Party.

Others

References

2023 Turkish general election
2023 leadership
Turkey leadership